Alismereti is a village in Nergeeti Community, Baghdati Municipality of Imereti region, Georgia. It is located North to Meskheti Range, on the right bank of Khanistskali River, 600 meters above sea level.

Demographics 

According to 2014 general census Alismereti has a population of 5.

See also 
Imereti
Baghdati Municipality

Bibliography 
 Georgian Soviet Encyclopedia, I, p. 312, Tbilisi, 1975

References 

Populated places in Baghdati Municipality